Garcia Live Volume Nine is a two-CD live album by Jerry Garcia and Merl Saunders.  It was recorded on August 11, 1974 at the Keystone in Berkeley, California.  It was released on July 28, 2017.

The musical lineup for this concert was Garcia on guitar and vocals, Saunders on keyboards and vocals, Martin Fierro on saxophone and flute, John Kahn on bass, and Bill Kreutzmann on drums.  A slightly later version of this band, with a different drummer, was called Legion of Mary.

Critical reception 
On AllMusic, Timothy Monger wrote, "Captured in the period between the release of the Grateful Dead's From the Mars Hotel LP and their touring hiatus that began in late 1974, this lively set from Jerry Garcia and longtime collaborator Merl Saunders has a comfortable, spontaneous ease to it....  By this point, the Saunders-Garcia partnership was already well established and their preferred venue, Keystone Berkeley, provided a relaxed space to try out the various facets of their funk, rock, and R&B repertoire.... The highlights, though, are in the extended jams, particularly the 19-minute "The Harder They Come", which feels like a dynamic zenith of this set."

On Grateful Web, Dylan Muhlberg said, "GarciaLive Volume Nine: August 11, 1974, Keystone Berkeley is like nothing you've heard previously from the Jerry Garcia catalog. It's remarkable how the supple drumming of Bill Kreutzmann varies the groove entirely, compared to Garcia's previous collaborator Bill Vitt and future associate Ron Tutt... Fans of Jerry Garcia need to get their hands on this release... This is like nothing you've ever heard before, with crystal-clear transfer. You'll be taken from your living room back to the intimate confines of the Keystone, Berkeley, for a night of infinite possibilities."

On Glide Magazine, Doug Collette wrote, "The nine selections of Volume Nine in this archival series well illustrate how a setlist can oftentimes barely scratch the surface of what went on below and beyond the songs documented in a given night’s performance.... Precursor to the band eventually dubbed Legion of Mary that coalesced later this same year, this quintet displays the same predilection to dig deeply into a groove, the depth of which recordist Betty Cantor-Jackson captures with her usual impeccable clarity (and which Fred Kevorkian preserves with his equally reliable mastering)."

Track listing 
Disc 1
First set:
"That's What Love Will Make You Do" (Henderson Thigpen, James Banks, Eddy Marion) – 13:14
"La La" (Martin Fierro) – 17:06
"It Ain't No Use" (Jerry Williams, Gary Bonds, Don Hollinger) – 10:57
"Mystery Train" (Junior Parker, Sam Phillips) – 13:33

Disc 2
Second set:
"The Harder They Come" (Jimmy Cliff) – 19:10
"Ain't No Woman (Like the One I've Got)" (Dennis Lambert, Brian Potter) – 17:01
"It's Too Late" (Chuck Willis) – 9:06
"(I'm a) Road Runner" (Brian Holland, Lamont Dozier, Eddie Holland) – 10:43
"The Night They Drove Old Dixie Down" (Robbie Robertson) – 6:34

Personnel 
Musicians
Jerry Garcia – guitar, vocals
Merl Saunders – keyboards, vocals
Martin Fierro – flute, saxophone
John Kahn – bass
Bill Kreutzmann – drums

Production
Produced by: Marc Allan, Kevin Monty
Original recordings produced by: Jerry Garcia
Recording: Betty Cantor-Jackson
Mastering: Fred Kevorkian
Art direction, design, illustration: Ryan Corey
Liner notes essay: Merl Saunders, Jr.
Photos: Larry Hulst, Roberto Rabanne
Project coordination: Lauren Goetzinger

References 

Jerry Garcia live albums
Merl Saunders albums
2017 live albums